Now's the Time is a 1932 short musical comedy film starring Harry Barris with Mary Carlisle as his leading lady. Its title is taken from its theme song, the popular Eddie Cantor song "Now's the Time to Fall in Love." Its working title was Love Nuts.

Plot
A summary from Motion Picture Herald reads:

Cast
Edgar Kennedy
Harry Barris
Mary Carlisle

Reception
"This Harry Barris comedy contains more really funny gags than any of the previous things in which he has been featured," a critic wrote for Photoplay. "It's fast and funny," a writer for The Film Daily claimed, "and about the best short that Barris has appeared in."

References

1932 films
American black-and-white films
American musical comedy films
1932 musical comedy films
1930s American films

External links